Mohammad Fairuz bin Zakaria (born 25 May 1997) is a Malaysian professional footballer who plays as a left-back for Penang.

Career statistics

Club

References

External links
 

1997 births
Living people
People from Kedah
Malaysian footballers
Association football fullbacks
Association football defenders
Malaysia Super League players
Perlis FA players
Penang F.C. players
Kedah Darul Aman F.C. players